Hanka may refer to:

 Angela Hanka, Austrian figure skater
 Václav Hanka (1791–1861), Czech philologist
 Hanka (film), 1955 Yugoslav film
 a variation of the given name Hannah